Kitty Girls' is the self-titled debut album by the Filipino pop singing group Kitty Girls. It was released on 2008 by Star Records.

Track listing

References

External links
 Kitty Girls Album on Star Records

2008 debut albums